Garra salweenica is a species of ray-finned fish in the genus Garra from Yunnan, Myanmar and Thailand.

References 

Garra
Taxa named by Sunder Lal Hora
Taxa named by Dev Dev Mukerji
Fish described in 1934